Paul Halter (born 19 June 1956) is a French writer of crime fiction known for his locked room mysteries.

Biography
Halter was born 19 June 1956 in Haguenau, Bas-Rhin France and pursued technical studies in his youth before joining the French Marines in the hope of seeing the world. Disappointed with the lack of travel, he left the military and, for a while, sold life insurance while augmenting his income playing the guitar in the local dance orchestra. He gave up life insurance for a job in the state-owned telecommunications company, where he works in what is now known as France Télécom. Halter has been compared with the late John Dickson Carr, generally considered the 20th century master of the locked room genre. Throughout his more than forty books his genre has been almost entirely impossible crimes, and as a critic has said "Although strongly influenced by Carr and Christie, his style is his own and he can stand comparison with anyone for the originality of his plots and puzzles and his atmospheric writing."

His first published novel, La Quatrieme Porte ("The Fourth Door") was published in 1988 and won the Prix de Cognac, given for detective literature. The following year, his novel Le Brouillard Rouge (Red Mist) won "one of the highest accolades in French mystery literature", the Prix du Roman d'Aventures. He has published more than forty books.  Several of his short stories have been translated into English; by June 2010 six had appeared in Ellery Queen's Mystery Magazine; ten were collected and published by Wildside Press as The Night of the Wolf.

Bibliography

Novels

Dr. Twist and Chief Inspector Hurst novels:
La quatrième porte (The Fourth Door) 1987
La mort vous invite (Death Invites You) 1988
La mort derrière les rideaux (Death Behind the Curtains) 1989
La chambre du fou (The Madman's Room) 1990
La tête du tigre (The Tiger's Head) 1991
La septième hypothèse (The Seventh Hypothesis) 1991
Le diable de Dartmoor (The Demon of Dartmoor) 1993
A 139 pas de la mort (139 Steps from Death) 1994
L'image trouble (The Blurred Image) 1995 (Translated as The Picture from the Past, Locked Room International, 2014)
La malédiction de Barberousse (The Curse of Barbarossa) 1995
L'arbre aux doigts tordus (The Tree with Twisted Fingers) 1996 (Translated as The Vampire Tree, Locked Room International, 2016)
Le cri de la sirène (The Siren's Shriek) 1998
Meurtre dans un manoir anglais (Murder in an English Manor) 1998
L'homme qui aimait les nuages (The Man Who Loved Clouds) 1999
L'allumette sanglante (The Bloody Match) 2001
Le toile de Pénélope (Penelope's Web) 2001
Les larmes de Sibyl (Sibyl's Tears) 2005
Les meurtres de la salamandre (The Salamander Murders) 2009
La corde d'argent (The Silver Thread) 2010
Le voyageur du passé (The Traveler from the Past) 2012
La tombe indienne (The Indian Tomb) 2013

Dr. Twist and Chief Inspector Hurst short stories:
"Les morts dansent la nuit" (The Dead Dance at Night) in the collection La nuit du loup (The Night of the Wolf) 2000
"L'appel de la Lorelei" (The Call of the Lorelei) in the collection La nuit du loup (The Night of the Wolf) 2000
"Meurtre à Cognac" (Murder in Cognac) in the collection La nuit du loup (The Night of the Wolf) 2000
"La balle de Nausicaa" (Nausicaa's Ball) in the collection La balle de Nausicaa 2011
"La tombe de David Jones" (David Jones' Tomb) in the collection La balle de Nausicaa 2011
"The Gong of Doom" in Ellery Queen's Mystery Magazine, June 2010
"Jacob's Ladder" in Ellery Queen's Mystery Magazine, February 2014
"The Scarecrow's Revenge" in Ellery Queen's Mystery Magazine, May 2016
"The Yellow Book" in Ellery Queen's Mystery Magazine, July–August 2017
"The Fires of Hell" in Ellery Queen's Mystery Magazine, May–June 2018

Owen Burns and Achilles Stock novels:
Le roi du désordre (The Lord of Misrule) 1994
Les sept merveilles du crime (The Seven Wonders of Crime) 1997
Les douze crimes d'Hercule (The Twelve Crimes of Hercules) 2001
La ruelle fantôme (The Phantom Passage) 2005
La chambre d'Horus (The Chamber of Horus) 2007
Le masque du vampire (The Mask of the Vampire) 2014
La montre en or (The Gold Watch) 2019
The White Lady 2020

Owen Burns and Achilles Stock short stories:
"La marchande de fleurs" (The Flower Girl) in the collection La nuit du loup (The Night of the Wolf) 2000
"La hache" (The Cleaver) in the collection La nuit du loup (The Night of the Wolf) 2000
"The Man with the Face of Clay" in Ellery Queen's Mystery Magazine, July 2012
"The Wolf of Fenrir" in Ellery Queen's Mystery Magazine, March–April 2015
"The Helm of Hades" in Ellery Queen's Mystery Magazine, March–April 2019
"The Celestial Thief" in Ellery Queen's Mystery Magazine, September–October 2021

Other novels:
Le brouillard rouge (The Crimson Fog) 1988
La lettre qui tue (The Deadly Letter) 1992
Le cercle invisible (The Invisible Circle) 1996
Le crime de Dédale (The Crime of Daedalus) 1997
Le géant de pierre (The Stone Giant) 1998
Le mystère de l'Allée des Anges (The Mystery of Angels' Lane) 1999
Le chemin de la lumière (The Path of Light) 2000
Les fleurs de Satan (Satan's Flowers) 2002
Le tigre borgne (The One-Eyed Tiger) 2004
Lunes assassines (Killers' Moon) 2006
La nuit du Minotaure (The Night of the Minotaur) 2008
Le testament de Silas Lydecker (The Will of Silas Lydecker) 2009
Spiral 2012

Other short stories:
"L'escalier assassin" (The Tunnel of Death) in the collection La nuit du loup (The Night of the Wolf) 2000
"Un rendez-vous aussi saugrenu" (untranslatable pun) in the collection La nuit du loup (The Night of the Wolf) 2000
"Ripperomanie" (Rippermania) in the collection La nuit du loup (The Night of the Wolf) 2000
"La nuit du loup" (The Night of the Wolf) in the collection La nuit du loup (The Night of the Wolf) 2000
"Le spectre doré" (The Golden Ghost) in the collection La balle de Nausicaa 2011 and "The Night of the Wolf" (English Edition) 2006
"Le regard étrange" (The Unsettling Gaze) in the collection La balle de Nausicaa 2011
"L'abominable homme de neige" (The Abominable Snowman) in the collection La balle de Nausicaa 2011 and The Night of the Wolf (English Edition) 2006
"Le clown de minuit" (The Midnight Clown) in the collection La balle de Nausicaa 2011
"La malle sanglante" (The Bloody Trunk) in the collection La balle de Nausicaa 2011

Short story collections:
La nuit du loup (The Night of the Wolf) 2000
La balle de Nausicaa (Nausicaa's Ball) 2011
The Helm of Hades 2019

References

1956 births
Living people
People from Haguenau
20th-century French novelists
21st-century French novelists
French crime fiction writers
French mystery writers
Writers from Grand Est
French male novelists
French male short story writers
20th-century French short story writers
21st-century French short story writers
20th-century French male writers
21st-century French male writers